Private First Class Charles Howard Roan (August 16, 1923 – September 18, 1944) was a United States Marine who sacrificed his life to save those of four fellow Marines in the landing on Peleliu during World War II.  For his heroism, he posthumously received his nation's highest military honor – the Medal of Honor.

On July 21, 1945, in a simple presentation ceremony on the Armstrong County Courthouse lawn, Mrs. Lillabel Roan, of  Claude, Texas, accepted the Medal of Honor posthumously awarded her son, Pfc. Charles Howard Roan, USMCR.

Biography

Early years
Charles Howard Roan was born August 16, 1923, in Claude, Texas. Until he performed his act of sacrifice, his life had been that of any small town American boy. Charles attended the local high school and worked in a local garage.

Marine Corps service
The youth enlisted in the Marine Corps Reserve in December 1942. A rifleman in the 2nd Battalion, 7th Marines, 1st Marine Division, he was already a veteran of bitter fighting when he threw himself upon a Japanese hand grenade in the Peleliu landing, saving four Marines in his unit at the cost of his own life on September 18, 1944. Prior to his death, he had been in two previous battles – New Guinea and Cape Gloucester — and had seen 15 months of overseas duty. In addition to the Medal of Honor and the Purple Heart, he also held the Asiatic–Pacific Campaign Medal with three battle stars.

Memorial services for PFC Roan took place in the Methodist Church in Claude on April 8, 1945.

Medal of Honor citation
For his actions at Peleliu in 1944 the Medal of Honor was awarded to Roan with the following citation:
The President of the United States takes pride in presenting the MEDAL OF HONOR posthumously to

for service as set forth in the following CITATION:

For conspicuous gallantry and intrepidity at the risk of his life above and beyond the call of duty while serving with the Second Battalion, Seventh Marines, First Marine Division, in action against enemy Japanese Forces on Peleliu, Palau Islands, 18 September 1944. Shortly after his leader ordered a withdrawal upon discovering that the squad was partly cut off from their company as a result of their rapid advance along an exposed ridge during an aggressive attack on the strongly entrenched enemy, Private First Class Roan and his companions were suddenly engaged in a furious exchange of hand grenades with Japanese forces emplaced in a cave on higher ground and the rear of the squad. Seeking protection with four other Marines in a depression the rocky, broken terrain, Private First Class Roan was wounded by an enemy grenade which fell close to their position and, immediately realizing the imminent peril to his comrades when another grenade landed in the midst of the group, unhesitatingly flung himself upon it, covering it with his body and absorbing the full impact of the explosion. By his prompt action and selfless conduct in the face of almost certain death, he saved the lives of four men. His great personal valor reflects the highest credit upon himself and the United States Naval Service. He gallantly gave his life for his comrades.

/S/ HARRY S. TRUMAN

Namesakes

The Texas State Veterans Home in Amarillo, opened in 2007,  bears the name of Charles H. Roan.

PFC Roan's name is inscribed on the Wall of the Missing at the American Battlefield Monuments Commission Cemetery outside the city of Manila, Philippines.

A memorial marker in honor of Roan is located in the Claude Cemetery, Armstrong County, Texas

See also

 List of Medal of Honor recipients

References

External links
  – inscription at the Manila American Cemetery and Memorial, Philippines
  – cenotaph at Claude Cemetery, Texas

1923 births
1944 deaths
United States Marine Corps Medal of Honor recipients
People from Amarillo, Texas
United States Marines
United States Marine Corps personnel killed in World War II
World War II recipients of the Medal of Honor
People from Claude, Texas
Deaths by hand grenade
Burials at the Manila American Cemetery
United States Marine Corps reservists
Military personnel from Texas